Pizarro is a 1799 historical tragedy by Richard Brinsley Sheridan. It was inspired by August von Kotzebue's play Die Spanier in Peru, based on the Spanish conquest of the Inca Empire in 1532 by Francisco Pizarro. It premiered at the Theatre Royal, Drury Lane in London on 24 May 1799. The cast included John Philip Kemble as Rolla, William Barrymore as Pizarro, Sarah Siddons as Elvira, Dorothea Jordan as Cora, Charles Kemble as Alonzo, John Powell as Ataliba, Thomas Caulfield as Almagro, Robert Palmer as Valverde, James Aickin as Las Casas, Richard Suett as Diego, William Dowton as Grozembo, William Chatterley as Boy and Charles Holland as Centinel. The music was composed by Michael Kelly. The epilogue was written by William Lamb, the future Prime Minister. It was popular success, running for 31 consecutive nights and being revived on a number of occasions. Sheridan's version was produced during the war with France, at a time when an invasion was feared.

References

Bibliography
 Gross, Jonathan David (ed.) Byron's "Corbeau Blanc": The Life and Letters of Lady Melbourne. Texas A&M University Press, 1998.
 Kelly, Linda. Richard Brinsley Sheridan. : A Life. Faber & Faber, 2012.
 Morwood, James & Crane, David. Sheridan Studies''. Cambridge University Press, 1995.

1799 plays
West End plays
Historical plays
Tragedy plays
British plays
Plays set in the 16th century
Plays by Richard Brinsley Sheridan